Otto Schmiedeknecht (8 September 1847 Bad Blankenburg, Thüringen- 11 February 1936, Blankenburg) was a German entomologist who specialised in Hymenoptera.

Selected works
1902-1936.Opuscula Ichneumonologica. Blankenburg in Thüringen.1902pp.
1907.Hymenopteren Mitteleuropas. Gustav Fischer. Jena. 804pp.
1914.Die Schlupfwespen (Ichneumonidae) Mitteleuropas, insbesondere deutschlands. In: Schoeder C. "Die Insekten Mitteleuropas". Franckh'sche Verlagshandlung, Stuttgart. pp. 113–170.

References

Möller, R. 2000: [Schmiedeknecht, O.] Rudolst. Naturhist. Schr. 10 83-90 (Under 'Opuscula ichneumonlogica) 
Oehlke, J. 1968: Über den Verbleib der Hymenopteren-Typen Schmiedeknechts. Beitr. Ent. , Berlin 18: 319-327

Sources
 Stefan Vidal (2005). The history of Hymenopteran parasitoid research in Germany, Biological Control, 32 : 25-33. 

German entomologists
Hymenopterists
1847 births
1936 deaths
Scientists from Thuringia
People from Saalfeld-Rudolstadt